Charles Winnans Cox (July 7, 1882 - March 28, 1958) was a  politician and timber contractor in Ontario, Canada. He was a Liberal member of the Legislative Assembly of Ontario representing the riding of Port Arthur from 1934 to 1943 and the riding of Fort William from 1948 to 1951. He was a member of Mitchell Hepburn's cabinet from 1936 to 1937. He also served as mayor of Port Arthur, Ontario from 1934 to 1948 and again in 1952.

Background
He was born on a farm in Westminster Township, Middlesex County, Ontario and worked as a farm and ranch hand near Nanton, Alberta. In about 1908 he moved to Port Arthur, Ontario. He became one of the largest timber contractors in the Thunder Bay region, then branched into general contracting.

Politics
He was elected as a councillor of Port Arthur in 1932, and became mayor in 1934. He served as mayor until 1948, being re-elected for 15 years.

A supporter of the Conservative Party while they were in power, he sought the Liberal nomination for Port Arthur riding for the June 1934 provincial election, and was elected to the Legislative Assembly of Ontario with 58.9% of the votes cast. Liberal Premier Mitchell Hepburn named him to cabinet as a minister without portfolio in December 1936.

Any chances of remaining a cabinet minister vanished in February 1937 when one of his love affairs went sour, and a 32-year-old teacher threw acid at him, scarring his handsome face and impairing the sight in his left eye. The scandal did not hurt him locally, and he was re-elected in the October 1937 election, but not re-appointed to cabinet.

He was defeated as a Liberal candidate in the 1943 election, and as an Independent in the 1945 election.

Always an unpredictable and controversial figure, he astonished most observers by running and getting elected in the neighbouring riding of Fort William, Ontario in the 1948 election as a Liberal candidate. That same year, still the retiring mayor of Port Arthur, he brazenly ran for mayor of Fort William, but lost to Hubert Badanai.

He ran in the 1950 Ontario Liberal leadership convention, placing sixth with 24 votes. He was defeated in the 1951 election. His last political victory came in 1952 when he was again elected as mayor of Port Arthur.

The death of his wife in July 1953 marked the end of his political career. He died in March 1958, tending furnace in a building he owned. A reporter for the Port Arthur News-Chronicle observed at his death,

An astute if unruly mayor he was once described as a man always in or on the brink of a consummate rage. Under a robust growth of steely-gray hair, his corrugated features approximated those of a truculent bulldog. He had the self-assurance of a man used to victory at the polls and was given to taunting his opponents with a tongue like a flame-thrower. "I can be mayor of Port Arthur as long as I wish", he said not long before his voluntary retirement from that position. "Do you think any other mayor is talked about as much as I am."

References

Further reading
 A.W. Rasporich, "Call me Charlie : Charles W. Cox, Port Arthur's populist politician," Thunder Bay Historical Museum Society Papers and Records, 19 (1991), 2-20.
 Mark Kuhlberg, "Nothing but a cash deal : Crown timber corruption in Northern Ontario, 1923-1930," Thunder Bay Historical Museum Society Papers and Records, 28 (2000), 3-22.
 Mark Kuhlberg, "'Nothing it seems can be done about it': Charlie Cox, Indian Affairs Timber Policy and the Long Lac Reserve, 1924–40," Canadian Historical Review, 84 (1) March 2003, 33-64.

External links

1882 births
1958 deaths
Mayors of Port Arthur, Ontario
Ontario Liberal Party MPPs
Politicians from Thunder Bay